Black Canyon Wilderness can refer to:
Black Canyon Wilderness (Nevada)
Black Canyon Wilderness (Oregon)
Black Canyon of the Gunnison Wilderness, Colorado

See also
Black Canyon Wilderness Study Area (disambiguation)